Isaac de Beausobre (8 March 1659 – 5 June 1738) was a French Protestant churchman, now best known for his two-volume history of Manichaeism, Histoire Critique de Manichée et du Manichéisme .

Life
Beausobre was born at Niort, Deux-Sèvres.  After studying theology at the Protestant Academy of Saumur, he was ordained at the age of twenty-two, becoming pastor at Châtillon-sur-Indre. After the revocation of the edict of Nantes he fled to Rotterdam (November 1685), and in 1686 was appointed chaplain in Oranienbaum to the princess of Anhalt-Dessau, Henrietta Catherine of Orange-Nassau.

In 1693, on the death of John George II, Prince of Anhalt-Dessau, he went to Berlin and became a court preacher, and in 1695 pastor for the French church at Friedrichswerder Church. He became court preacher, counsellor of the French Reformed Consistory, director of the Maison française, a hospice for French people, inspector of the French gymnasium and superintendent of all the French churches in Brandenburg.

He had strong sense with profound erudition, was one of the best writers of his time and an excellent preacher.

Family
Beausobre was married twice. By his first wife he had a son, Charles Louis de Beausobre (1690–1753), who became a pastor and theologian, and a member of the Prussian Academy of Sciences in Berlin. By his second wife, Charlotte Schwarz, he had another son, Louis de Beausobre (1730–1783), who became a philosopher and political economist, and also a member of the Academy of Sciences.

Bibliography
; 2 (1739)

References

Attribution

External links
 Biographical Sketch
 "Isaac De Beausobre Revisited: The Birth of Manichean Studies" by Guy Stroumsa

1659 births
1738 deaths
Huguenots
People from Niort
French Calvinist and Reformed ministers
Members of the Prussian Academy of Sciences